George William Swepson (June 23, 1819 – March 7, 1883) was a carpetbagger and a swindler notable for his involvement in the 1868 North Carolina railroad bonds scandal.

References

1819 births
1883 deaths
North Carolina Republicans